The name "silver trout" is also sometimes used for rainbow trout.

The silver trout (Salvelinus agassizii) is an extinct char species or variety that inhabited a few waters in New Hampshire prior to 1939, when a biological survey conducted on the Connecticut watershed by the New Hampshire Fish and Game Department found none.

Description
The silver trout was often a foot long and was said to actually be olive green in color. In the lakes silver trout inhabited, large quantities of the species appeared in October to spawn.

Systematic position
To formally describe the species and prevent local fishermen from overharvesting in the absence of bag limits, specimens were sent to Harvard and the U.S. National Museum for identification, where the fish was first described as a form of lake trout (Salvelinus namaycush), and later as a variety of brook trout (Salvelinus fontinalis). The silver trout was described as Salmo agassizii in 1885. W.C.Kendall, who published a famous monograph on New England chars in 1914, in turn concluded that the silver trout was related to the Arctic char (Salvelinus alpinus).

Re-examining the 13 silver trout specimens in the U.S. National Museum by matching the markings on the dorsal fin and tail, the numbers of vertebrae, and the array of pelvic fin rays and between different species, Robert J. Behnke concluded that the silver trout was most closely related to the brook trout, while the divergence was still concluded to be enough to place it outside of typical S. fontinalis. Behnke concluded the silver trout evolved from brook trout ancestors in New England lakes with deep, cold, clear, well-oxygenated depths as a planctivorous fish.

Distribution
The silver trout was an exceedingly rare fish, having become trapped by changed drainage systems in two New Hampshire lakes (Dublin/Monadnock Pond and Christine Lake in Stark) that were left as successors of Lake Hitchcock, a very large glacial lake that persisted for 4000 years where the silver trout probably evolved from brook trout. In the deep waters of these lakes, cut off from other species, the silver trout had no natural predators.

Extinction
By the late 19th century, as each lake developed its own steady summer tourism, recreational fishermen who sought to increase their catches began to introduce new fish species, and these eventually overwhelmed the native silver trout. Yellow perch, which eat trout eggs, and lake trout, which hold the same ecological niche, as well as eat and hybridize with other char species, were particularly devastating. Other species were also introduced that have proved to be devastating to native trout species in other waters, the rainbow trout, brown trout, Atlantic salmon, and rainbow smelt.

While the silver trout is most likely lost, success stories like the Pyramid Lake (Nevada) Lahontan cutthroat trout and the Sunapee golden trout exist, and there may still be hope for the silver trout.

References

External links
 

Salvelinus
Cold water fish
Fish of North America becoming extinct since 1500
Taxa named by Samuel Garman
Fish described in 1885
Extinct animals of the United States
Natural history of New Hampshire
Species endangered by invasive species